In enzymology, a peptide-methionine (R)-S-oxide reductase is an enzyme that catalyzes the chemical reaction

peptide-L-methionine + thioredoxin disulfide + H2O  peptide-L-methionine (R)-S-oxide + thioredoxin

The 3 substrates of this enzyme are peptide-L-methionine, thioredoxin disulfide, and H2O, whereas its two products are peptide-L-methionine (R)-S-oxide and thioredoxin.

This enzyme belongs to the family of oxidoreductases, specifically those acting on a sulfur group of donors with a disulfide as acceptor.  The systematic name of this enzyme class is peptide-methionine:thioredoxin-disulfide S-oxidoreductase [methionine (R)-S-oxide-forming]. Other names in common use include MsrB, methionine sulfoxide reductase (ambiguous), pMSR, methionine S-oxide reductase (ambiguous), selenoprotein R, methionine S-oxide reductase (R-form oxidizing), methionine sulfoxide reductase B, SelR, SelX, PilB, and pRMsr.

References

 
 
 
 
 
 
 
 
 
 

EC 1.8.4
Enzymes of unknown structure
Selenoproteins